Daniel Fišl (born 17 June 2000) is a Czech football player. He plays for 1. FK Příbram on loan from MFK Chrudim.

Club career
He made his Czech National Football League debut for Olympia Radotín on 4 March 2018 in a game against FK Viktoria Žižkov.

References

External links
 

2000 births
Living people
Czech footballers
Czech Republic youth international footballers
Association football defenders
AC Sparta Prague players
SK Dynamo České Budějovice players
FK Dukla Prague players
Czech National Football League players
MFK Chrudim players
1. FK Příbram players